Greenberg is a surname common in North America, with anglicized spelling of the German Grünberg (green mountain) or the Jewish Ashkenazi Yiddish Grinberg, an artificial surname.

Notable people with the surname Greenberg include:

A–D 
 Abraham Greenberg (1881–1941), New York politician
 Adam Greenberg (disambiguation), several people
 Aharon-Ya'akov Greenberg (1900–1963), Israeli politician
 Alan Greenberg (disambiguation), several people
 Albert Greenberg, American software engineer
 Allan Greenberg (born 1938), American new classical architect
 Andrew Greenberg, American video game designer
 Andrew C. Greenberg (born 1957), video game designer
 Ari Greenberg (born 1981), American bridge player
 Bernard Greenberg, American programmer and computer scientist
 Brad Greenberg (born 1954), American basketball coach, brother of Seth Greenberg
 Bryan Greenberg (born 1978), American actor
 Brooke Greenberg (1993–2013), American with "Syndrome X" condition
 Carl Greenberg (1908–1984), American journalist
 Charles Greenberg (born 1953) American composer
 Clement Greenberg (1909–1994), American art critic
 Craig Greenberg (born 1973), American politician
 Dan Greenberg (born 1965), American lawyer and politician
 Daniel Greenberg (educator), American columnist and educator
 Daniel Greenberg (game designer), role-playing and video game designer
 Daniel S. Greenberg (1931–2020), American journalist, editor and author

E–L
 Eliezer Greenberg (1896–1977), American Yiddish poet
Elinor Miller Greenberg (1932–2021), American adult education pioneer
 Ellen Rae Greenberg (1983–2011), American teacher
 Evan G. Greenberg (born 1955), American business executive 
 Gail Greenberg (born 1938), American bridge player
 Gerald B. Greenberg (1936–2017), American film editor
 Gary Greenberg, American TV writer, author and comedian
 Hank Greenberg (1911–1986), American Hall of Fame baseball player
 Harold Greenberg (1930–1996), Canadian film producer
 Hayim Greenberg (1889–1953), American philosopher of Judaism 
 Ivan Greenberg (1896–1966), English journalist
 Irving Greenberg (born 1933), American Modern Orthodox rabbi and author
 Jack Greenberg (1924–2016), American attorney and legal scholar
 Jack M. Greenberg (born 1942), American executive at McDonald's
 Jay Greenberg (composer) (born 1991), American composer and cellist
 Jay Greenberg (psychoanalyst) (born 1942), American psychoanalyst and psychologist
 Jeffrey W. Greenberg (born 1951), American lawyer and business executive
 Jill Greenberg (born 1967), American photographer
 Joanne Greenberg (born 1932), American writer
 Joseph Greenberg (1915–2001), American linguist
 Joshua Greenberg (born 1976), American academic
 L. J. Greenberg (1861–1931), British Jewish journalist

M–R 
 Martin Greenberg (1918–2013), American science fiction anthologist and publisher
 Martin Greenberg (poet) (1918–2021), American poet and translator
 Martin H. Greenberg (1941–2011), American speculative fiction anthologist
 Maurice R. Greenberg (born 1925), American business executive 
 Michael Greenberg (economist) (1914–1992), British economic historian 
 Michael Greenberg (lawyer), American lawyer
 Michael Greenberg (writer) (born 1952), American writer
 Mike Greenberg (born 1967), American television and radio host
 Morton Ira Greenberg (1933–2021), United States Circuit Court judge
 Moshe Greenberg (1928–2010), American rabbi and Biblical scholar 
 Noah Greenberg, (1919–1966), American choral conductor
 Oscar W. Greenberg (born 1932), American physicist
 Ralph Greenberg (born 1944), American mathematician
 Richard Greenberg (born 1958), American playwright and television writer
 Robert Greenberg (born 1954), American composer, pianist, and musicologist
 Roman Greenberg (born 1982), Israeli heavyweight boxer

S–Z 
 Samuel Greenberg (1893–1917), American poet
 Samuel L. Greenberg (1898–1992), New York state senator
 Sanford Greenberg American philanthropist most well known for his efforts toward the goal of ending blindness
 Seth Greenberg, American coach of the Virginia Tech Hokies basketball team, brother of Brad Greenberg
Seymour Greenberg (1920–2006), American tennis player
 Shawn Greenberg, Manitoba judge
 Stan Greenberg, American political strategist
 Steve Greenberg (record producer), American noted for "discovering" popular musical acts such as Hanson, Baha Men and Joss Stone
 Steven Greenberg (musician), American musician best known for writing the 1980 hit song "Funkytown", performed by Lipps Inc.
 Steven Greenberg (rabbi), American rabbi, educator and author

See also 
 
 Greenberg (film), 2010 film
 Greenburg (disambiguation)
 Grünberg (disambiguation) (also Grunbergg)
 Grinberg
 Grynberg

References

External links 
 Greenberg on behindthename.com

Jewish surnames
Yiddish-language surnames